The TateLaBianca murders were a series of murders perpetrated by members of the Manson Family during August 810, 1969, in Los Angeles, California, United States, under the direction of Tex Watson and Charles Manson. The perpetrators killed six people on the night of August 8–9: pregnant actress Sharon Tate (whose unborn child died as a result) and her companions Jay Sebring, Abigail Folger, and Wojciech Frykowski, along with Steven Parent. The following evening, the Family also murdered supermarket executive Leno LaBianca and his wife Rosemary, at their home in the Los Feliz section of Los Angeles.

On the night of August 8–9, four members of the Manson Family, Watson, Susan Atkins, Patricia Krenwinkel, and Linda Kasabian, drove from Spahn Ranch to 10050 Cielo Drive in Benedict Canyon, the home of Sharon Tate and her husband, film director Roman Polanski. The group murdered Tate, who was 8½ months pregnant; guests Jay Sebring, a celebrity hairdresser; Abigail Folger, a coffee heiress; her boyfriend Wojciech Frykowski, an aspiring screenwriter; and Steven Parent, an 18-year-old visiting the property's caretaker. Polanski was working in Europe on a film. Manson was a cult leader and aspiring musician who had tried to get a contract with record producer Terry Melcher, who had previously rented the house. 

The following night, those four people, in addition to Manson, Leslie Van Houten and Steve "Clem" Grogan, committed two more murders. Manson had allegedly said he would "show them how to do it". After they considered various options, Kasabian drove the group to 3301 Waverly Drive in the Los Feliz neighborhood, the home of the LaBiancas. Manson left with Atkins, Grogan, and Kasabian. Watson, Krenwinkel, and Van Houten killed the couple in the early morning hours of August 10.

Tate murders 

On the night of August 8, 1969, Tex Watson took Susan Atkins, Linda Kasabian, and Patricia Krenwinkel to 10050 Cielo Drive in Benedict Canyon, Los Angeles, California. Watson claims Charles Manson had instructed him (Watson) go to the house and "totally destroy" everyone in it, and to do it "as gruesome as you can". Manson told the women to do as Watson instructed them.

The occupants of the house at Cielo Drive that evening were movie actress Sharon Tate, who was 8 months pregnant and the wife of film director Roman Polanski; her friend and former lover Jay Sebring, a noted celebrity hairstylist; Polanski's friend Wojciech Frykowski; and Frykowski's girlfriend Abigail Folger, heiress to the Folgers coffee fortune and daughter of Peter Folger. Also present on the property were William Garretson, the caretaker, and his friend Steven Parent. Polanski was in Europe working on a film. Music producer Quincy Jones was a friend of Sebring who had planned to join him that evening but did not go. 

Watson and the three women arrived at Cielo Drive just past midnight on August 9, 1969. Watson climbed a telephone pole near the entrance gate and cut the phone line to the house. The group backed their car to the bottom of the hill that led to the estate and walked back up to the house. They thought that the gate might be electrified or equipped with an alarm, so they climbed a brushy embankment to the right of the gate and entered the grounds. Headlights approached them from within the property, and Watson ordered the women to lie in the bushes. He stepped out and ordered the approaching driver to halt. Steven Parent had been visiting the property's caretaker, William Garretson, who lived in the guest house. Watson leveled a .22 caliber revolver at Parent, who begged him not to hurt him, claiming that he would not say anything. Watson lunged at Parent with a knife, giving him a defensive slash wound on the palm of his hand that severed tendons and tore the boy's watch off his wrist, then shot him four times in the chest and abdomen, killing him in the front seat of his white 1965 AMC Ambassador coupe. Watson ordered the women to help push the car farther up the driveway.

Watson next cut the screen of a window, then told Kasabian to keep watch down by the gate; she walked over to Parent's car and waited. Watson removed the screen, entered through the window, and let Atkins and Krenwinkel in through the front door. He whispered to Atkins and awoke Frykowski, who was sleeping on the living room couch. Watson kicked him in the head, and Frykowski asked him who he was and what he was doing there. Watson replied, "I'm the devil, and I'm here to do the devil's business."

On Watson's direction, Atkins found the house's three other occupants with Krenwinkel's help and forced them to the living room. Watson began to tie Tate and Sebring together by their necks with rope which he had brought, then slung it over one of the living room's ceiling beams. Sebring protested the murderers' rough treatment of the pregnant Tate, so Watson shot him. Folger was taken momentarily back to her bedroom for her purse, and she gave the murderers $70. Watson then stabbed Sebring seven times.

Frykowski's hands had been bound with a towel, but he freed himself and began struggling with Atkins, who stabbed at his legs with a knife. He fought his way out the front door and onto the porch, but Watson caught up with him, struck him over the head with the gun multiple times, stabbed him repeatedly, and shot him twice.

Kasabian had heard "horrifying sounds" and moved toward the house from her position in the driveway. She told Atkins that someone was coming in an attempt to stop the murders. Inside the house, Folger escaped from Krenwinkel and fled out a bedroom door to the pool area. Krenwinkel pursued her and caught her on the front lawn where she stabbed her and tackled her to the ground. Watson then helped kill her; her assailants stabbed her a total of 28 times. Frykowski struggled across the lawn, but Watson continued to stab him, killing him. Frykowski suffered 51 stab wounds, and had also been struck 13 times in the head with the butt of Watson's gun, which bent the barrel and broke off one side of the gun grip, which was recovered at the scene. In the house, Tate pleaded to be allowed to live long enough to give birth, and offered herself as a hostage in an attempt to save the life of her unborn child, but both Atkins and Watson stabbed Tate 16 times, killing her. According to Watson, Manson had told the women to "leave a sign—something witchy". Atkins wrote "pig" on the front door in Tate's blood. Atkins claims she did this to copycat the murder scene of Gary Hinman in order to get Manson Family member Bobby Beausoleil out of jail, who was in custody for the murder. Beausoleil wrote "political piggy" in Hinman's blood on his wall after stabbing him to death.

LaBianca murders 

The four murderers plus Manson, Leslie Van Houten and Clem Grogan went for a drive the following night. Manson was allegedly displeased with the panic and flight of the victims in the previous night's murders. He told Kasabian to drive to a house at 3301 Waverly Drive in the Los Feliz section of Los Angeles. Located next door to a home where Manson and Family members had attended a party the previous year, it belonged to supermarket executive Leno LaBianca and his wife Rosemary, co-owner of a dress shop.

According to Atkins and Kasabian, Manson disappeared up the driveway and returned to say that he had tied up the house's occupants. Then Watson, Krenwinkel, and Van Houten went in. Watson claims in his autobiography that Manson went up alone, then returned to take him up to the house with him. Manson pointed out a sleeping man through a window, and the two entered through the unlocked back door. Watson claims Manson roused the sleeping Leno LaBianca from the couch at gunpoint and had Watson bind his hands with a leather thong. Rosemary was brought into the living room from the bedroom, and Watson covered the couple's heads with pillowcases which he bound in place with lamp cords. Manson left, and Krenwinkel and Van Houten entered the house.

Watson had complained to Manson earlier of the inadequacy of the previous night's weapons. Watson sent the women from the kitchen to the bedroom, where Rosemary LaBianca had been returned, while he went to the living room and began stabbing Leno LaBianca with a chrome-plated bayonet. The first thrust went into his throat. Watson heard a scuffle in the bedroom and went in there to discover Rosemary LaBianca keeping the women at bay by swinging the lamp tied to her neck. He stabbed her several times with the bayonet, then returned to the living room and resumed attacking Leno, whom he stabbed a total of 12 times. He then carved the word "WAR" into his abdomen. Watson returned to the bedroom and found Krenwinkel stabbing Rosemary with a knife from the kitchen. Van Houten stabbed her approximately 16 times in the back and the exposed buttocks. Van Houten claimed at trial that Rosemary LaBianca was already dead during the stabbing. Evidence showed that many of the 41 stab wounds had, in fact, been inflicted post-mortem. Watson then cleaned off the bayonet and showered, while Krenwinkel wrote "Rise" and "Death to pigs" on the walls and "Healter  Skelter" on the refrigerator door, all in LaBianca's blood. She gave Leno LaBianca 14 puncture wounds with an ivory-handled, two-tined carving fork, which she left jutting out of his stomach. She also planted a steak knife in his throat.

Meanwhile, Manson drove the other three Family members who had departed Spahn with him that evening to the Venice home of the Lebanese actor Saladin Nader. Manson left them there and drove back to Spahn Ranch, leaving them and the LaBianca killers to hitchhike home. According to Kasabian, Manson wanted his followers to murder Nader in his apartment, but Kasabian claims she thwarted this murder by deliberately knocking on the wrong apartment door and waking a stranger. The group abandoned the murder plan and left, but Atkins defecated in the stairwell on the way out.

Investigation, trial and sentencing 

In initial confessions to cellmates at Sybil Brand Institute, Atkins said she killed Tate. In later statements to her attorney, to prosecutor Vincent Bugliosi, and before a grand jury, Atkins indicated Tate had been stabbed by Tex Watson.

In his 1978 autobiography, Watson said that he had stabbed Tate and that Atkins had never touched her. Since he was aware that the prosecutor, Bugliosi, and the jury, that had tried the other Tate–LaBianca defendants, were convinced Atkins had stabbed Tate, he falsely testified that he did not stab her.

The five perpetrators  Atkins, Krenwinkel, Manson, Van Houten, and Watson  were each tried and convicted for their roles in the TateLaBianca murders. Originally, each defendant received a death sentence. However, in 1972, the Supreme Court of California ruled in People v. Anderson that the state's then-current death penalty laws were unconstitutional. As a result, the Anderson decision spared the lives of 107 death row inmates in California, including Charles Manson and his four "family members".

 Susan Atkins (19482009): Atkins remained in prison until her death from brain cancer at age 61 in 2009.  At the time of her death, she was California's longest-serving female inmate.  Atkins had been denied parole 14 times, and her request for compassionate release had also been denied.
 Patricia Krenwinkel (born 1947): Imprisoned in 1971, Krenwinkel remains incarcerated.  Following the 2009 death of fellow Manson gang member Susan Atkins, Krenwinkel is now the longest-incarcerated female inmate in the California penal system.  She has been denied parole 14 times, most recently in 2017. Following revisions to California parole laws and policy changes by the sitting Los Angeles DA, a parole panel recommended her release for the first time in May 2022; however, this parole recommendation was overturned by California governor Gavin Newsom (who had similarly previously overturned the parole recommendation for Manson family member Leslie Van Houten).
 Charles Manson (19342017): Manson remained imprisoned until his death from cardiac arrest resulting from respiratory failure and colon cancer on November 19, 2017. He was just a few days past his 83rd birthday, and had spent all but 13 years of his life in some sort of supervised setting (either prison, reformatory or boys' home).  While in prison, Manson had been denied parole 12 times.  After 1997, he refused to attend any of his parole hearings. 
 Leslie Van Houten (born 1949): Upon her conviction and death sentence in 1971, at the age of 21, Van Houten became the youngest woman ever put on California's death row, as well as the youngest member of the Manson Family convicted of murder.  (Her original conviction and death sentence was overturned on appeal.  She was later retried and sentenced to life in prison with the possibility of parole.)  Currently incarcerated, Van Houten has been denied parole 22 times, most recently in 2019.  At her three most recent parole hearings, Van Houten was approved for parole by the board, but in each case the board's decision was overturned by California's governor (first Jerry Brown, most recently by Gavin Newsom).
 Charles "Tex" Watson (born 1945):  Watson remains incarcerated.  He has been denied parole 17 times, most recently in 2021.  While imprisoned, Watson claims that he became a born-again Christian.

Allegations of U.S government involvement 
In 2019, journalist Tom O'Neill published the book CHAOS: Charles Manson, the CIA, and the Secret History of the Sixties, in which he argued that the true story of the killings had been covered up. O'Neill presented evidence showing that Bugliosi had tampered with witnesses, including instructing Terry Melcher to claim that he had never talked to Manson after the murders, and that the family's drug use had been studied by researchers at a medical facility before the murders, who induced them to take various illegal drugs and attempted to figure out if these drugs could lead to violent behavior. One of these researchers working at the facility (although it is unknown if he was involved in the Manson study or worked only on other projects) was Louis Jolyon West, a scientist who had participated in CIA experiments involving the hypnosis of unwilling subjects, psychiatrically examined Jack Ruby, and killed an elephant with LSD in a bizarre botched experiment. O'Neill suggested that the FBI and CIA may have incited the family to commit the murders as part of their CHAOS and COINTELPRO projects to discredit leftist movements. O'Neill noted that the Manson murders led to widespread distrust of Hippies among the American people and that the FBI had used violence to discredit the political left in the past such as in the murder of Fred Hampton, but admitted that he had no direct evidence for his theory, and was unsure of it himself. The Washington Post referred to O'Neill's discoveries as "stunning."

Sociocultural impact 

The Tate–LaBianca murders "profoundly shook America's perception of itself" and "effectively sounded the death knell of '60s counterculture". Additionally, the ritualistic nature of the murders laid a foundation for the rise of Satanic Panic.

Culturally, it led to the proliferation of "darkly psychosexual, conspiracy-laced cultural exploration of America's seedy underbelly" by the movie industry, including films such as A Clockwork Orange (1971) and Dirty Harry (1971).

In popular culture

Helter Skelter: The True Story of The Manson Murders 
In 1974, after leaving the DA's office, prosecutor Vincent Bugliosi, jointly with Curt Gentry, wrote a book about the Manson trial called Helter Skelter: The True Story of The Manson Murders. The book won an Edgar Award from the Mystery Writers of America for the best true-crime book of the year. The book was twice adapted as a television film, first in 1976, then later in 2004.  , Helter Skelter was the best-selling true crime book in publishing history, with more than seven million copies sold.

Film and television 
Several films recounted the Tate–LaBianca murders and the subsequent criminal trials:

 Manson, a 1973 documentary about Manson and his followers
 Helter Skelter, a 1976 television film based on the 1974 book by prosecutor Vincent Bugliosi and Curt Gentry
 Helter Skelter, a 2004 television film remake of the 1976 TV film of the same name
 Aquarius (2015 TV series)
 Wolves at the Door, a 2016 film
 Mindhunter, a 2017 Netflix series
 American Horror Story (2011- / TV series) Season 7, Episode 10
 Charlie Says, a 2018 drama film starring Matt Smith as Manson
 The Haunting of Sharon Tate, a 2019 supernatural horror film starring Hilary Duff as Tate
 Once Upon a Time in Hollywood, a 2019 comedy-drama film featuring a fictionalized revisionist account of the evening of the murders
 Helter Skelter: An American Myth, a comprehensive 2020 six-part documentary film about Manson, the Family, the murders and the trial on EPIX network.

Books 
In addition to Bugliosi's Helter Skelter: The True Story of The Manson Murders (1974), these are the other books about the murders:
The Girls, a 2016 novel by Emma Cline loosely inspired by the Manson family
 CHAOS: Charles Manson, the CIA, and the Secret History of the Sixties, a 2019 non-fiction book by Tom O'Neill with Dan Piepenbring

Music 
 The Manson Family: An Opera, a 1990 opera by John Moran

References 

1969 in California
1969 in Los Angeles
1969 murders in the United States
Attacks in the United States in 1969
August 1969 events in the United States
Crime in California
Deaths by firearm in California
Deaths by stabbing in California
Manson Family
Mass murder in 1969
Mass murder in California
Mass murder in the United States
Murder in Los Angeles
Murdered American children
Roman Polanski